Euroway was a Swedish ferry company that operated  cruise ferries between Sweden and Germany from 1992 till 1994.

History
Founded by the Norwegian businessman, Elling Ellingsen, owner of Sea-Link Shipping AB, with the objective to set up cruiseferry connections between the cities of Malmö in Sweden and Lübeck in Germany. Euroway's business concept was to provide a cruise ship-style experience.

Euroway planned to open their service in mid-1991, however the first of two large car and passenger ferries ordered from the Brodogradiliste Split shipyard in Croatia, was delayed because of the Yugoslav wars. The first ship, M/S Frans Suell, was not delivered until May 1992. The start was troublesome; it was for a long time unclear when scheduled traffic would begin and marketing was poorly executed. On May 19, Frans Suell made her first trip from Malmö to Travemünde. On September 1, the route was extended to Lübeck with a one way trip from Malmö to Lübeck via Travemünde taking approximately 15 hours. Due to a request from the city of Lübeck to avoid additional traffic congestion, Euroway had to stop in Travemünde to let boarded cars off. Euroway's main target groups were cruise and conference passengers and initially no trucks were carried. 

A sister ship for Frans Suell was initially ordered, but delays at the shipyard and poor profitability made Euroway cancel its order later on. If the ship would have been delivered to Euroway its name would have been M/S Frans Kockum. The shipyard continued working on the ship and eventually sold it to the shipping company DFDS. Euroway speculated in chartering the Viking Line ship M/S Olympia from Rederi AB Slite, but the deal did not go through.

Due to management problems and the economic situation in Europe, Sea Link AB was by 1993 looking for a partner for Euroway. Silja Line joined Euroway and the company changed its name to Silja Line Euroway with Silja's Silja Festival being added as a second ship. A major factor in the teamup of Silja and Euroway was Swedish Nordbanken, which was a major funder of both Silja and Euroway. In September the Euroway route was extended to Copenhagen - Malmö - Travemünde - Lübeck, and trucks were now allowed on board. On 12 March 1994 the Euroway service was cancelled due to lack of passengers and Silja Line's financial problems.

Timetables

Fleet
M/S Frans Suell (1992–1994)
M/S Silja Festival (1993–1994)
M/S Frans Kockum (cancelled order)

External links and references
The Euroway Memory Page

Ferry companies of Sweden
Defunct transport companies of Sweden
Defunct shipping companies